The Saturn Awards for Best Fantasy Film is an award presented to the best film in the fantasy genre by the Academy of Science Fiction, Fantasy & Horror Films.

Winners and nominees

1970s

1980s

1990s

2000s

2010s

2020s

External links
Official Site
Internet Movie Database: 2nd, 3rd, 4th, 5th, 6th, 7th, 8th, 9th, 10th, 11th, 12th, 13th, 14th, 15th, 16th, 17th, 18th, 19th, 20th, 21st, 22nd, 23rd, 24th, 25th, 26th, 27th, 28th, 29th, 30th, 31st, 32nd, 33rd, 34th, 35th, 36th, 37th, 38th, 39th, 40th, 41st, 42nd, 43rd

Fantasy Film